HMS Endymion was a first-class protected cruiser of the . She served in China during the Boxer Rebellion and later in the First World War, and was sold in 1920.

Construction
She displaced . Armament consisted of two 9.2 inch guns, on the ships centreline, backed up by ten six-inch  guns, of which four were in casemates on the main deck and the remainder behind open shields. Twelve 6-pounder and four 3-pounder guns provided anti-torpedo-boat defences, while four 18 inch torpedo tubes were fitted.

Service details
Endymion was  launched on 22 July 1891.

Endymion took part in suppressing the Boxer Rebellion in China, during which time future rear admiral and VC recipient Eric Gascoigne Robinson served aboard her. Captain Alfred Paget was appointed in command in February 1901, and in December 1901 she visited Manila, where the Governor and US officers hosted the crew, including many with whom they had served together during the rebellion. She was ordered home in late May 1902, stopping in Singapore on 22 June, Colombo on 5 July, Suez on 22 July, Malta on 28 July, and Gibraltar on 1 August, before she returned to Portsmouth. She took part in the fleet review held at Spithead on 16 August 1902 for the coronation of King Edward VII, and paid off at Chatham on 4 September 1902 when she was placed in the C division of the Medway fleet reserve
She was flag ship in Cork Harbour in 1914.

Endymion served in the First World War in the Gallipoli Campaign. On 30 August 1918, she was damaged at Stavros, Greece by the Imperial German Navy submarine ; her crew survived.

Endymion was sold for breaking up at Cardiff on 16 March 1920.

Notes

References

External links
  Transcription of ship's logbooks December 1913 to December 1918

 

Edgar-class cruisers
Ships built on the Humber
Victorian-era cruisers of the United Kingdom
World War I cruisers of the United Kingdom
1891 ships
Maritime incidents in 1918